PJ Loughran (born October 4, 1973) is an American illustrator, musician and entrepreneur.

Career
After graduating from the Parsons School of Design, Loughran began his career as in illustrator doing work for the Op-Ed pages of The New York Times. He has created over 2,000 illustrations for publications and publishers including ESPN, Coca-Cola, Nike, Foot Locker, Guitar World, The Village Voice, Time and Harper's Magazine.

Loughran is the former founder and CEO of Kerosene Creative Services, which he sold in 2009 to Manifest Digital. He served as Chief Creative Officer of Manifest Digital for two years. In 2012, he founded The Distillery, a Chicago/LA-based digital creative and social media agency. 

In 2013, Loughran sold the Distillery to Superfly, best known as the co-founders of the Bonnaroo Music and Arts Festival in Manchester, TN and the Outside Lands festival in San Francisco, CA, where he is served as their Executive Creative Director and then President.

In 2019, Loughran left Superfly to start EMÁJYN, a VIP / executive events firm specializing in high-end corporate experiences, with an emphasis on talent and behind-the-scenes access to entertainment and culture.

in 2020, Loughran founded two additional new companies - LOUGHRAN & CO, a brand marketing agency focusing on brand creation, design strategy, content marketing and fractional CMO advisement, and FUNNY WATER, a beverage company that produces an alcoholic still water, featuring 3 flavors, low alcohol, low calories, and electrolytes and anti-oxidants.

Music
Loughran is also a musician and songwriter. Since 2001, he has completed four albums, Grenadine in 2001, Sunrise Run in 2006, Spinning On in 2012 and McKinley and Miles in 2018, the last of which was produced by Grammy Award nominated record producer John Alagia. Loughran has toured and opened for many prominent artists, including Maroon 5, R.E.M, Johnny Lang, Martin Sexton, Taj Mahal, Todd Rundgren, REO Speedwagon, and The North Mississippi All-Stars.

In 2020, Loughran released an EP, "Davenport - Songs From Quarantine", detailing his experiences during the COVID-19 pandemic between March and April 2020.

References

1973 births
American chief executives
American illustrators
American male musicians
American multi-instrumentalists
American male songwriters
Living people